Nicolás Catalán (Chilpancingo, 1780 - 1838) was a leader of the resistance stage of the Mexican War of Independence, active in the current state of Guerrero. He was married to Antonia Nava de Catalán.

He was promoted to the rank of general on 22 February 1823. He died in Chilpancingo on 17 March 1838.

References 

1780 births
1838 deaths